Yutaka Kaneko may refer to:
 Yutaka Kaneko (footballer)
 Yutaka Kaneko (wrestler)